Upper Myanmar (also called Upper Burma) is a geographic region of Myanmar, traditionally encompassing Mandalay and its periphery (modern Mandalay, Sagaing, Magway Regions), or more broadly speaking, Kachin and Shan States.

In the Burmese language, people originating from Upper Myanmar are typically called a-nya tha, whereas those from Lower Myanmar are called auk tha.

The term "upper Burma" was first used by the British to refer to the central and northern area of what is now modern day Myanmar. After the Second Anglo-Burmese War of 1852, Lower Myanmar was annexed by the British Empire, while Upper Myanmar remained independent under the Burmese Empire until the Third Anglo-Burmese War of 1885. Upper Myanmar was also known as encompassing "Burma proper" and the Kingdom of Ava. Historically, Upper Myanmar was predominantly Bamar (whereas Lower Myanmar was historically Mon-speaking until the early 19th century), while the Frontier Areas, as designated by the colonial administration, included ethnic minority areas, such as the Shan States and modern Kachin State.

This distinction between Upper and Lower Myanmar is also found in some government departments (for instance, the Ministry of Education has departments assigned to Upper or Lower Myanmar), while some newspapers make a distinction between the two bodies. The Burmese language edition of The Myanmar Times is an example; the newspaper devotes a section to news from Upper Myanmar. In terms of linguistic differences, there are minute differences between the variants of Burmese spoken by Upper Burmese, especially in vocabulary choice (such as kinship terms that differentiate the maternal and paternal sides of a family, which is not made in Lower Burmese speech). However, there is remarkable uniformity in the Burmese spoken throughout the Irrawaddy River valley, which also includes the delta-lying and coastal region of Lower Myanmar.

Regions of Myanmar

References

History of Myanmar
+